Union Square station was a streetcar stop on the Green Line A branch located at Union Square in the Allston neighborhood of Boston, Massachusetts.  It was closed in 1969 when service on the line was suspended and replaced by buses.

References

Railway stations in Boston
Green Line (MBTA) stations
Former MBTA stations in Massachusetts
Railway stations closed in 1969